The Yemen thrush (Turdus menachensis) is a species of bird in the thrush family Turdidae. It is native to the Sarawat Mountains of the western Arabian peninsula.

References

External links
ARKive - images and movies of the Yemen thrush (Turdus menachensis)
BirdLife Species Factsheet

Yemen thrush
Birds of the Arabian Peninsula
Yemen thrush
Taxa named by William Robert Ogilvie-Grant